The 1972 Summer Olympics were held in Munich, West Germany, 29 events in swimming were contested.  There was a total of 532 participants from 52 countries competing.

Perhaps the most spectacular athletic events were in swimming. Mark Spitz had a remarkable run, competing in seven events, winning seven Olympic titles and setting seven world records. In 2008, Michael Phelps matched Spitz's feat of setting seven world records in a single Olympics. According to the official Olympic website, "He took part in the 4×200 m one hour after his final in the 100 m butterfly. As for the 200 m freestyle gold, it was his third medal in three days" .

On the women's side of the competition, Shane Gould of Australia won five medals. She won the 200 m and 400 m freestyle as well as the 200 m individual medley, each with a new world-record time. In addition, she won the silver and the bronze in the 800 m and 100 m freestyle, respectively. In 2022, Gould remains the only woman in history to have claimed five medals in solo events in swimming at a single Olympic Games. Another 15-years-old, American Sandy Neilson, won three gold medals.

The Olympic record was broken at least once in all 29 events. In 20 of those events, a new world record was set.

Events 
The following events were contested (all pool events were long course, and distances are in metres unless otherwise stated):

Freestyle: 100 m, 200 m, 400 m, 800 m (women), 1500 m (men)
Backstroke: 100 m, 200 m
Breaststroke: 100 m, 200 m
Butterfly: 100 m, 200 m
Individual Medley: 200 m, 400 m
Relays: 4 × 100 m free, 4 × 200 m free (men); 4 × 100 m medley

Participating nations 
532 swimmers from 52 nations competed.

Medal table

Results

Men's events

Women's events

Gallery of the medalists 
Some of the Olympic medalists in Munich:

References 

 
1972 Summer Olympics events
1972
1972 in swimming